The Smyrna School District is a public school district in northern Kent County and extreme southern New Castle County, Delaware in the United States. The district is based in Smyrna.

Geography
The Smyrna School District serves the northern portion Kent County and the extreme southern portion of New Castle County in the state of Delaware. Communities served by the district include Smyrna, Clayton, and Kenton as well as a portion of Leipsic.

School board
Kristi Lloyd, President
Scot McClymont, Vice President
Vetra Evans-Gunter
Dr. Charlie Wilson
Christine Malec
Patrik Williams, Executive Secretary  
Deborah Judy, Assistant Secretary

Schools
High school
Smyrna High School

Middle school
Smyrna Middle School

Middle schools
Clayton Intermediate School
Moore (John Bassett) Intermediate School
Smyrna Middle School

Elementary schools
Clayton Elementary School
North Smyrna Elementary School
Smyrna Elementary School
Sunnyside Elementary School

See also
List of school districts in Delaware

References

School districts in Kent County, Delaware
School districts in New Castle County, Delaware